The South Korean standard language or Pyojuneo is the South Korean standard version of the Korean language. It is based on the Seoul dialect, although various words are borrowed from other regional dialects. It uses the Hangul alphabet, created in December 1443 CE by the Joseon-era king Sejong the Great. Unlike the North Korean standard language, the South Korean standard language includes many loan-words from Chinese, as well as some from English and other European languages.

History
When Korea was under Japanese rule, the use of the Korean language was regulated by the Japanese government. To counter the influence of the Japanese authorities, the Korean Language Society (한글 학회) began collecting dialect data from all over Korea and later created their own standard version of Korean, Pyojuneo, with the release of their book Unification of Korean Spellings in 1933.

See also
 North–South differences in the Korean language
 Korean language

References

Korean language
Korea, South
Korean dialects
Korean language in South Korea